This is a list of notable Israeli Druze.

The list is ordered by category of human endeavor. Persons with significant contributions in two fields are listed in both of the pertinent categories, to facilitate easy lookup.

Politicians and government officials 

 Labib Hussein Abu Rokan – politician who served as a member of the Knesset for Cooperation and Brotherhood between 1959 and 1961.
 Hamad Amar – politician and currently serves as a member of the Knesset for Yisrael Beiteinu.
 Assad Assad – former officer, diplomat and politician who served as a member of the Knesset for Likud between 1992 and 1996.
 Zeidan Atashi – former diplomat and politician who served as a member of the Knesset for the Democratic Movement for Change and Shinui between 1977 and 1981, and again from 1984 until 1988. 
 Amal Nasser el-Din – author and former politician who served as a member of the Knesset for Likud between 1977 and 1988.
 Salah-Hassan Hanifes – politician who served as a member of the Knesset for Progress and Work between 1951 and 1959.
 Ayoob Kara – currently a member of the Knesset for Likud and Minister of Communications, formerly Deputy Minister for Development of the Negev and Galilee.
 Reda Mansour – poet, historian and diplomat.
 Gadeer Mreeh — journalist and politician, serving as a member of the Knesset for Blue and White since April 2019. She is the first Druze woman to serve in the Knesset. 
 Jabr Muadi – politician who served as a member of the Knesset for seven different parties between 1951 and 1981.
 Mohamed Nafa – politician who served as a member of the Knesset for Hadash from 1990 until 1992. 
 Said Nafa – member of the Knesset for the Arab party Balad.
 Shachiv Shnaan – served as a member of the Knesset for the Labor Party between 2008 and 2009.
 Salah Tarif – member of the Knesset between 1992 and 2006. When appointed Minister without Portfolio by Ariel Sharon in 2001, he became Israel's first non-Jewish government minister.
 Majalli Wahabi – politician who served as a member of the Knesset for Likud, Kadima and Hatnuah. He briefly assumed the position of President due to President Moshe Katzav's leave of absence and Acting President Dalia Itzik's trip abroad in February 2007, making him the first non-Jew to act as Israel's head of state.

Military 
 Ghassan Alian – first non-Jewish commander of the Golani Brigade.
 Imad Fares – former Brig. General in the Israeli Defense Force. He won acclaim as the commander of the Givati Brigade (infantry) from 2001–2003.
 Majdi Halabi – disappeared on May 24, 2005, at age 19, while attempting to hitchhike from his hometown to his Ordnance Corps camp near Tirat Carmel.
 Ihab Khatib – soldier
 Yusef Mishleb – the first Israeli Druze to be promoted to the rank of colonel in the IDF. Served in part as commander of the Etzion Regional Brigade, commander of the Edom Division, as Coordinator of Government Activities in the Territories and as the commander of the Home Front Command. 
 Haiel Sitawe and Kamil Shnaan – border police

Sports 

 Mahran Lala – footballer playing for Hapoel Tel Aviv.
 Nazar Mahmud – figure skater.

Writers 

 Rami Zeedan- author, political scientist, and historian.
 Salman Masalha – poet, writer, essayist and translator.
 Samih al-Qasim – a well-known poet throughout the Arab World.
 Salman Natour – writer, journalist and playwright.

Miscellaneous 
 Azzam Azzam – convicted in Egypt in August 1997 of spying for Israel, and jailed for eight years. He maintained his innocence throughout the ordeal.
 Angelina Fares – beauty pageant contestant. She was a finalist in Miss Israel 2007. 
 Toufik Mansour  Mathematician and professor at the Haifa University working in the field of combinatorics.

 Amin Tarif - the spiritual leader of the Druze in Israel from 1928 till his death in 1993.
 Mowafaq Tarif - grandson of Amin Tarif and spiritual leader of the Druze in Israel since 1993.

See also
 Israelis
 List of notable Israelis
 List of Druze
 Druze in Israel

References

Arab citizens of Israel
Druze
 
Arab